is a railway station on the Suigun Line in the town of Tanagura, Fukushima, Japan operated by East Japan Railway Company (JR East).

Lines

Station layout
Chikatsu Station has one side platform serving a single bi-directional track. The station is unattended. The station formerly had two side platforms, and the unused side platform remains in place.

History
Chikatsu Station opened on November 11, 1932. The station was absorbed into the JR East network upon the privatization of the Japanese National Railways (JNR) on April 1, 1987.

Surrounding area

Chikatsu Post Office

See also
 List of Railway Stations in Japan

External links

  

Stations of East Japan Railway Company
Railway stations in Fukushima Prefecture
Suigun Line
Railway stations in Japan opened in 1932
Tanagura, Fukushima